Corina Knoll is an American editor and journalist who writes for California and Sports sections for the Los Angeles Times.

Career
Knoll has also covered US Soccer for ESPN Soccernet.com, with her first article about Dax McCarty titled "McCarty pursues his passion" being published on January 19, 2006.  Knoll has also worked in the public relations department of the Minnesota Timberwolves of the National Basketball Association. She worked in sports marketing before pursuing a freelance writing career. Afterwards, she was soon hired by KoreAm Journal. She has assumed the roles of senior writer and senior editor while with the magazine. She served the role of managing editor from February 2007 to March 2008.

Currently, Knoll writes for the Metro section of the Los Angeles Times. She was on the team that investigated corruption in Bell — which led to the paper's 2011 Pulitzer Prize for public service — and went on to cover the trials of the city's former officials. She later contributed to the paper's coverage of the San Bernardino terror attack that won the 2016 Pulitzer Prize for breaking news. As a regional reporter, she wrote features about the San Gabriel Valley and the Westside. During her courts beat, she covered high-profile criminal cases and civil disputes, including the Jackson family vs AEG and Bryan Stow vs LA Dodgers. In her current gig she is called upon to rewrite breaking news stories and also writes long-form narratives. Recently, she and two colleagues investigated sheriff's deputies whose histories of misconduct landed them on the department's top-secret Brady list. Raised in the Midwest, she is a graduate of Macalester College.

Personal life
Knoll is a Korean adoptee who was raised in Iowa and graduated from Macalester College. Knoll moved to Los Angeles in November 2000 despite not having a job or a place to live. On July 28, 2007, she married Hollywood screenwriter Greg Colleton at Weyerhauser Chapel on the campus of their alma mater, Macalester College in St. Paul, Minnesota. Although both are alumni of the college, they did not meet while attending college but rather met through friends in Los Angeles.

Honors and awards
In 2003, she was the recipient of the 2003 New California Media Award for her story about Korean golfers on the LPGA tour which appeared in the December 2002 issue of KoreAm Journal.
In 2006, she was the recipient of an NCM Expo Award for her article about single Korean American mothers which appeared in the December 2004 issue of KoreAm Journal

References

External links
 LA Weekly

American women journalists
American magazine editors
South Korean emigrants to the United States
American writers of Korean descent
Macalester College alumni
Writers from Iowa
Year of birth missing (living people)
Living people
American adoptees
Women magazine editors
21st-century American women